Staub v. Proctor Hospital, 562 U.S. 411 (2011), was a decision by the Supreme Court of the United States, in which the Court held that employers are still liable under the Uniformed Services Employment and Reemployment Rights Act if they fire an employee based on the recommendation of a subordinate who is acting out of hostility towards the employee's military obligations, even if the firing employer is not aware of or does not hold those discriminatory views himself.

Background

Statutory provisions
The Uniformed Services Employment and Reemployment Rights Act (USERRA) was passed by Congress in 1994 to guarantee to military reservists a return to their civilian jobs after their deployments. The law also offers protection against termination or other retaliation against current and former military members because of their military obligations. USERRA says, in part, that:

Lower court proceedings
The case arose when Vincent Staub, the plaintiff, was terminated from his job as a radiology technician at Proctor Hospital in Illinois in April 2004. Staub was a member of the Army Reserve and was periodically required to take time off of work for training. According to Staub, Janice Mulally and Michael Korenchuk, two of Staub's supervisors, were openly hostile towards him and belittled his military obligations. In 2004, Korenchuk advised the hospital's vice-president of human resources, Linda Buck, that Staub had broken a rule about remaining in the hospital while not seeing patients, despite the fact that Staub had merely visited the hospital's cafeteria and Staub had left a note for his supervisors explaining his absence after he could not contact them directly.

Staub was fired from his job for the alleged breach of the minor infraction. He sued the hospital, claiming that the complaint against him was a sham, and  that the real reason he had been fired was due to the hatred of military members demonstrated by his supervisors. The jury sided with Staub and awarded him damages, but the hospital appealed the judgement. The Seventh Circuit reversed the jury's decision, and found in favor of the hospital. Staub appealed, and was granted certiorari by the Supreme Court.

The Supreme Court's decision
The Supreme Court reversed the decision made by the Seventh Circuit in a unanimous 8-0 vote on 1 March 2011, with Justice Elena Kagan recusing herself. In the Court's opinion, written by Justice Antonin Scalia, the Court opined that "since a supervisor is an agent of the employer, when he causes an adverse employment action the employer causes it; and when discrimination is a motivating factor in his doing so, it is a 'motivating factor in the employer's action.'” Therefore, if a biased supervisor tries to get an employee fired, and that employee is in fact fired as a result, then the fired employee can sue the employer for employment discrimination, "even if the biased supervisor is not the final decision maker and even if the final decision maker is unbiased."

See also
List of United States Supreme Court cases, volume 562

References

External links
 

2011 in United States case law
United States employment discrimination case law
United States Supreme Court cases
United States Supreme Court cases of the Roberts Court